Art Smakaj (born 4 February 2003) is a Kosovan footballer who plays as a central-midfielder for Croatian club Lokomotiva.

Club career
On 11 December 2021, Smakaj was named as a Lokomotiva substitute for the first time in a Croatian First League match against Hajduk Split. His debut with Lokomotiva came on 26 February 2022 in a 2–0 home win against Gorica after being named in the starting line-up.

International career

Under-19
On 30 September 2021, Smakaj was named as part of the Kosovo U19 squad for 2022 UEFA European Under-19 Championship qualifications. Six days later, he made his debut with Kosovo U19 in a match against Norway U19 after being named in the starting line-up.

Under-21
On 30 May 2022, Smakaj received a call-up from Kosovo U21 for the 2023 UEFA European Under-21 Championship qualification matches against Andorra U21, England U21 and Albania U21. His debut with Kosovo U21 came on 4 June in the 2023 UEFA European Under-21 Championship qualification match against Andorra after coming on as a substitute at 74th minute in place of Qëndrim Zyba.

References

External links
 

2003 births
Living people
Footballers from Zagreb
Croatian people of Kosovan descent
Croatian people of Albanian descent
Association football central defenders
Croatian footballers
Kosovan footballers
Kosovo youth international footballers
Kosovo under-21 international footballers
NK Lokomotiva Zagreb players
Croatian Football League players